Tiszatenyő is a village in Jász-Nagykun-Szolnok county, in the Northern Great Plain region of central Hungary.

Geography
It's about  far from Szolnok. It has a railway station in the 120 (Budapest East Railway Station-Szolnok-Békéscsaba-Arad) and the 130 (Szolnok-Tiszatenyő-Szentes-Makó) rail line. It has also a bus stop on the Törökszentmiklós-Martfű road.

References

External links
 Official site in Hungarian

Populated places in Jász-Nagykun-Szolnok County